Doña María de la Soledad Becerril y Bustamante, Marquise consort of Salvatierra (born 16 August 1944 in Madrid, Spain) is a Spanish noble, politician and long serving member of the Spanish Congress of Deputies who belongs to the People's Party (PP). In 1981 she served as the first female Government Minister in almost 50 years and later became the first female Mayor of Seville. Becerril is married to Rafael Atienza y Medina, 8th Marquis of Salvatierra and Chancellor of the Royal Cavalry Armory of Seville

Early career
Married with two children, Becerril graduated in philosophy and letters at the University of Madrid, specialising in English philology. She subsequently worked as a lecturer at the University of Seville. She entered politics in 1974 when she joined the Federation of Democratic and Liberal parties and subsequently joined the Democratic Party of Andalusia (PDA). The PDA joined with other parties in May 1977 to form the Union of the Democratic Centre (UCD), a coalition which won the first democratic election since the death of Franco and the end of Francoist Spain. Becerril was elected as a UCD deputy to the Spanish Congress of Deputies representing Seville Province and was re-elected at the 1979 election.

Minister of Culture 
In December 1981 the new Prime Minister Leopoldo Calvo-Sotelo appointed her Minister of Culture. Becerril thus became the first female Minister in Spain since the Second Spanish Republic, almost 50 years earlier, and only the second female Spanish Minister in history after Federica Montseny in 1936.

People's Party
Like most UCD deputies, she lost her seat at the 1982 General Election and the UCD disbanded in February 1983. She subsequently joined the PP and in 1989 returned to the Spanish Congress as a PP deputy and was re-elected in 1996 and 2000. In 2004 she was elected to the Spanish Senate and served one term until 2008. In 2008 she returned to the Congress of Deputies, replacing Javier Arenas as head of the PP list on the recommendation of Arenas.

Mayor of Seville
Becerril also served as a local councillor in Seville. She served as Deputy Mayor from 1991 to 1995 and then Mayor of the city from 1995 to 1999 becoming the first female Mayor of Seville.

In 1998, while on her way to Switzerland to promote Seville's candidacy for the 2008 Olympics, Becerril's plane was hijacked at Valencia Airport, though the hijacker surrendered without injuring any passengers.

Defender of the People (Ombudsman)
On 29 June 2012, she was appointed Defender of the People until 21 July 2017.

References

External links
Biography at Spanish Congress site
Interview in El Mundo 24 September 1998

1944 births
Living people
Politicians from Madrid
Government ministers of Spain
Ombudsmen in Spain
Mayors of Seville
Members of the constituent Congress of Deputies (Spain)
Members of the 1st Congress of Deputies (Spain)
Members of the 4th Congress of Deputies (Spain)
Members of the 5th Congress of Deputies (Spain)
Members of the 6th Congress of Deputies (Spain)
Members of the 7th Congress of Deputies (Spain)
Members of the 9th Congress of Deputies (Spain)
Members of the Senate of Spain
Women mayors of places in Spain
People's Party (Spain) politicians
Union of the Democratic Centre (Spain) politicians
Academic staff of the University of Seville
People from Seville
20th-century Spanish women politicians
21st-century Spanish women politicians
Women government ministers of Spain
Grand Officers of the Order of Merit of the Italian Republic
Seville city councillors